Manianka may refer to:
Manya language
Senoufo language